Despreciado (Eng.: Unappreciated) is the title of a studio album released in 2001 by Regional Mexican artist Lupillo Rivera. This album became his first number-one album in the Billboard Top Latin Albums. It also won two Billboard Latin Music Awards in 2002. In the same year, it won the award for Regional Mexican Album of the Year at the 14th Lo Nuestro Awards ceremony.

Track listing
This track listing from Billboard.com.
Tomando y Tomando (Martín Ruvalcaba) — 2:27
Despreciado (José Alfredo Jiménez) — 2:50
Qué Te Ha Dado Esa Mujer (Gustavo Rivera) — 3:38
El Barzón (Miguel Muñiz) — 3:18
Tragos Amargos (Jesse Salcedo/F. Martínez) — 3:08
Copa Tras Copa (Rubén Méndez/Rubén Fuentes) — 2:00
Tu Recuerdo y Yo (José Alfredo Jiménez) — 2:56
Se Les Peló el Moreño (Lupillo Rivera) — 3:04
Mi Gusto Es (Dolores Ayala) — 3:30
Yo No Fuí (Consuelo Velázquez) — 2:39
Dedicatoria (Lupillo Rivera) — 1:04

Credits
This information from Allmusic.
Vicente Diarte: Arranger
José Ángel Cabrera: Engineer, mixing
Mario Bucio: Art direction

Chart performance

Sales and certifications

References

2001 albums
Lupillo Rivera albums
Sony Discos albums